Maria de Lourdes Ruivo da Silva de Matos Pintasilgo  (18 January 1930 – 10 July 2004) was a Portuguese chemical engineer and politician. She was the first and to date only woman to serve as Prime Minister of Portugal, and the second woman to serve as prime minister in Western Europe, after Margaret Thatcher.

Early life 
Maria de Lourdes Pintasilgo was born to a middle-class family in 1930. Her father, Jaime de Matos Pintasilgo (born Covilhã, Conceição, 9 December 1896 – died Lisbon, Socorro, 10 October 1959) was in the wool business, and her mother was Amélia do Carmo Ruivo da Silva, a native of Vendas Novas. Her parents married in Abrantes on 14 March 1929.

Her father, Jaime, abandoned the family and at school she tried hard to hide that, thus causing her to avoid usual relationships. At the age of seven, she was sent to the Liceu Filipa de Lencastre, a secondary school, in Lisbon. She distinguished herself in the Mocidade Portuguesa, a militaristic youth movement founded by Dictator Salazar. Later she joined Acção Católica (Catholic Action). During her years at the Instituto Superior Técnico from where she earned a degree in industrial chemical engineering, she joined and eventually led the Catholic's women's student movement.

Career 
After graduating from University of Lisbon's Instituto Superior Técnico in 1953, at the age of 23, with an engineering degree in industrial chemistry she went into a graduate scholarship program with the national Nuclear Energy Board. After completing the program, she began working for a large Portuguese conglomerate with interests in cement plants, Companhia União Fabril, the "CUF". By 1954, she held the position of chief engineer of the studies and projects division. From that position she quickly moved to the position of project director, where she was in charge of the firm's documentation center and responsible for the company's technical journals. She held this position for seven years, until she left the company in 1960.

Pintasilgo had strong ties to the Roman Catholic Church. From 1952 to 1956, at Lisbon's Catholic University of Portugal, she was president of the women's group. In 1956 she became the international president of a movement of Catholic students, Pax Romana. In 1961, Pintasilgo joined the Grail (Graal), an international Catholic laywomen's movement. Two years after joining the Grail she led an international group working to improve the movement as well as establishing it in Portugal.

By 1965 she had become the Grail's international vice-president. She was also appointed by the Vatican and served as woman's liaison between the Roman Catholic Church and the World Council of Churches. After leaving Companhia União Fabril, she held a job in government until 1969 which was to run Portugal's program for development and social change. In 1970, she presided over government working groups involving women's affairs, as well as being a member of the Portuguese delegation to the United Nations, 1971–72. In 1974 she was appointed secretary of state for social welfare in the first provisional government following the revolution. She moved her way up to Minister of Social Affairs by early 1975. In 1975, Pintasilgo became Portugal's first Ambassador to the United Nations Educational, Scientific and Cultural Organization, UNESCO.

Prime Minister and after
In 1979 she was called on by General António Ramalho Eanes, the president of Portugal, to become prime minister. Pintasilgo was sworn in as the Prime Minister of the Portuguese caretaker government on 1 August 1979 with the term of three months in office. During her time in office she pushed to modernize the out-dated social welfare system. She left her mark by making social security universal and improving health care, education, and labor legislation in Portugal.

She contributed the piece "Daring to be different" to the 1984 anthology Sisterhood Is Global: The International Women's Movement Anthology, edited by Robin Morgan.

Pintasilgo was the first woman to run for president in 1986. She ran as an independent and received 7% of the votes. The following year she was elected to the European Parliament as a member of the Socialist Party which she held until 1989.

From 1992 and for almost a decade, she chaired the Independent Commission for Population and Quality of Life - ICPQL. Hosted by the United Nations Educational, Scientific and Cultural Organization, UNESCO, in Paris, the international Commission was established by a coalition of governments and global Foundations in order to make recommendations to be presented to the UN system and donors community. In her statement at the Cairo UN International Conference on Population and Development on Sept, 7, 1994, Maria de Lourdes Pintasilgo explained, "The ultimate goal of Population and Development is to accord an improved quality of life to the people of the world. Not only to count people but to ensure that people count in Development". The commission's report was published in 1996 under the title: "Caring for the Future, Making the Next Decades Provide a Life Worth Living", edited by Oxford University Press.

Maria de Lourdes Pintasilgo died of cardiac arrest at her home in Lisbon on 10 July 2004, aged 74. She was buried in Prazeres Cemetery, in Lisbon.

Electoral results

1986 Portuguese presidential election

|-
!style="background-color:#E9E9E9" align=left colspan="2" rowspan="2"|Candidates
!style="background-color:#E9E9E9" align=left rowspan="2"|Supporting parties 	
!style="background-color:#E9E9E9" align=right colspan="2"|First round
!style="background-color:#E9E9E9" align=right colspan="2"|Second round
|-
!style="background-color:#E9E9E9" align=right|Votes
!style="background-color:#E9E9E9" align=right|%
!style="background-color:#E9E9E9" align=right|Votes
!style="background-color:#E9E9E9" align=right|%
|-
|style="width: 9px" bgcolor=#FF66FF align="center" | 
|align=left|Mário Soares
|align=left|Socialist Party
|align="right" |1,443,683
|align="right" |25.43
|align="right" |3,010,756
|align="right" |51.18
|-
|style="width: 8px" bgcolor=#0093DD align="center" | 
|align=left|Diogo Freitas do Amaral
|align=left|Democratic and Social Centre, Social Democratic Party
|align="right" |2,629,597	
|align="right" |46.31
|align="right" |2,872,064	
|align="right" |48.82
|-
|style="width: 8px" bgcolor=red align="center" | 
|align=left|Francisco Salgado Zenha
|align=left|Portuguese Communist Party, Democratic Renovator Party
|align="right" |1,185,867
|align="right" |20.88
|colspan="2" rowspan="3"| 
|-
|style="width: 8px" bgcolor=gray align="center" |
|align=left|Maria de Lourdes Pintasilgo
|align=left|Independent
|align="right" |418,961
|align="right" |7.38
|-
|style="width: 8px" bgcolor=red align="center" |
|align=left|Ângelo Veloso
|align=left|Portuguese Communist Party
|colspan="2" align="center" |left the race
|-
|colspan="3" align=left style="background-color:#E9E9E9"|Total valid
|width="65" align="right" style="background-color:#E9E9E9"|5,677,525
|width="40" align="right" style="background-color:#E9E9E9"|100.00
|width="65" align="right" style="background-color:#E9E9E9"|5,882,820
|width="40" align="right" style="background-color:#E9E9E9"|100.00
|-
|align=right colspan="3"|Blank ballots
|width="65" align="right" |46,334
|width="40" align="right" |0.81
|width="65" align="right" |33,844
|width="40" align="right" |0.57
|-
|align=right colspan="3" |Invalid ballots
|width="65" align="right"|18,292
|width="40" align="right"|0.32
|width="65" align="right"|20,436
|width="40" align="right"|0.34
|-
|colspan="3" align=left style="background-color:#E9E9E9"|Total (turnout 75.38% and 77.99%)
|width="65" align="right" style="background-color:#E9E9E9"|5,742,151 
|width="40" align="right" style="background-color:#E9E9E9"|
|width="65" align="right" style="background-color:#E9E9E9"|5,937,100 
|width="40" align="right" style="background-color:#E9E9E9"|
|-
| colspan=7 align=left|He left the race in favor of Salgado Zenha.
|-
|colspan=7 align=left|Source: Comissão Nacional de Eleições
|}

Maria de Lourdes Pintasilgo Award

Maria de Lourdes Pintasilgo was a former student at Instituto Superior Técnico (IST), one of the most prestigious Engineering faculties in Portugal. Since 2016, IST promotes the Maria de Lourdes Pintasilgo Award aiming to recognise and reward annually two women, graduated at IST, as a way to promote the gender balance policy at IST as well as recognise the crucial role that women have in all fields of Engineering.

References

Further reading
 Skard, Torild (2014) "Maria de Lourdes Pintasilgo" in Women of Power - Half a century of female presidents and prime ministers worldwide, Brtistol: Policy Press, .

1930 births
2004 deaths
20th-century Portuguese politicians
20th-century women rulers
Catholic socialists
Grand Crosses of the Order of Christ (Portugal)
Grand Crosses of the Order of Liberty
Grand Crosses of the Order of Prince Henry
Instituto Superior Técnico alumni
MEPs for Portugal 1987–1989
20th-century women MEPs for Portugal
People from Abrantes
Portuguese chemical engineers
Portuguese Christian socialists
Portuguese Roman Catholics
Candidates for President of Portugal
Prime Ministers of Portugal
Socialist Party (Portugal) MEPs
Socialist Party (Portugal) politicians
Women government ministers of Portugal
Women prime ministers
Female Christian socialists
Women chemical engineers